The Mozart Bird or  De Mozart Bird  is a 1993 Dutch romantic drama film directed by Aryan Kaganof.

Cast
Stacey Grace	... 	Selene
Daniel Daran	... 	Howard
Rosalind George		
Gabrielle Provaas

External links 
 

1993 films
1990s Dutch-language films
1993 romantic drama films
Dutch romantic drama films